Eusabena miltochristalis is a moth in the family Crambidae. It was first described in 1896 by George Hampson. It is found in north-eastern India, Myanmar and Taiwan.

References

Moths described in 1896
Spilomelinae